Qaiser Naqvi is a Pakistani actress. She is known for her roles in dramas Main Chand Si, Humsafar, Shikwa and Ek Tamanna Lahasil Si.

Early life
Qaiser was born in 1958 on December 8th in Karachi, Pakistan. She completed her studies from University of Karachi. She started working at Radio Pakistan in Lahore in 1970s.

Career
She made her debut as an actress on PTV in 1970s. She was noted for her roles in dramas Intezar Farmaiye, Sassi, Tapish, Mera Nam Hai Muhabbat, Chhoti Si Duniya and Uljhan. She also appeared in dramas Kaash Main Teri Beti Na Hoti, Moorat, Ahmed Habib Ki Betiyan, Riyasat, Tootay Huway Per and Omer Dadi Aur Gharwale. Since then she appeared in dramas Humnasheen, Meri Ladli, Iqraar, Bhai, Shikwa, Kaanch Ki Guriya and Hari Hari Churiyaan. In 2015 she appeared in movie Manto and she also appeared in telefilms.

Personal life
Her husband died in late 1970s. She has four daughters.

Filmography

Television

Telefilm

Film

Awards and nominations

References

External links
 

1958 births
Living people
20th-century Pakistani actresses
Pakistani television actresses
21st-century Pakistani actresses
Pakistani film actresses